is a Japanese professional wrestler who currently works for DDT Pro-Wrestling (DDT), where he is a member of the Eruption stable.

Professional wrestling career

DDT Pro-Wrestling (2020–present)
Okatani made his professional wrestling debut with DDT Pro-Wrestling (DDT) on March 20, 2020, at Judgement where he teamed with Shunma Katsumata and lost to Naomi Yoshimura and Keigo Nakamura. On June 20, he had his first win in a singles match against Keigo Nakamura. In July, he joined Jun Akiyama's stable Akiyama-gun (later renamed Junretsu).

On June 6, 2021, at CyberFight Festival, he was scheduled to take part in the DDT vs. Kongō 14-man tag team match, but before the event, Masa Kitamiya left Kongō which led to the match being changed to a 12-man tag team match, and Okatani was then scheduled for a singles match against Kitamiya, which he lost in under three minutes. On October 12, at Get Alive, Junretsu failed to capture the KO-D 8-Man Tag Team Championship from Team Olympian (Yoshiaki Yatsu, Akito, Hiroshi Yamato and Keigo Nakamura). As a result, and as per Junretsu leader Makoto Oishi's decision, the stable disbanded on October 23. On November 10, at the D-Oh Grand Prix 2021 II event at Shinjuku Face, Okatani pinned Akito to win the Ironman Heavymetalweight Championship. He then quickly lost it to Kazuki Hirata at the same event.

On January 3, 2022, Okatani was defeated by Eruption member Kazusada Higuchi. After the match, the rest of Eruption (Yukio Sakaguchi and Saki Akai) welcomed Okatani in their stable.

Championships and accomplishments
DDT Pro-Wrestling
Ironman Heavymetalweight Championship (1 time)

References

External links

Hideki Okatani's profile on DDT's website

2000 births
Living people
Japanese male professional wrestlers
21st-century professional wrestlers
Ironman Heavymetalweight Champions